The Loot, also known as The Bloody Tattoo, (Chinese: 賊贓) is 1980 martial art comedy movie directed by Eric Tsang and starring David Chiang and Philip Ko

Plot
The rival bounty hunter, Yang Wai (David Chiang) who has been working for the police department has been hired by Chiu Foon (Kwan Young Moon) to protect himself from the Spider, a mysterious and deadly criminal that no one has been found yet. Meanwhile, Fang Chung (Norman Chu Siu-Keung) has been busting robbers while impersonating as a fake Spider. When the real mastermind Chiu Foon and Killer Ko Yu Shing (Philip Ko) has been stealing the treasures, Yang Wai and Fang Chung decided to investigate on the robbery and take Ko Yu Shing and Chiu Foon down once and for all.

Casts
David Chiang as Yang Wai/Robert
Norman Chui as Fang Chung
Kwan Young Moon as Chiu Foon
Philip Ko as Ko Yu Shing
Lily Li as Kong Fei Ha
Alan Chui Chung-San as Thief Black Wolf 
Eric Tsang as Security Chief's assistant 
Chan Gwan-Biu as Chan Gwan Bo
Chen Shao Lung as Chiu Foon's Bodyguard
Huang Ha as Chiu Foon's Bodyguard
Lee Gong as Thief Cover Head West
Gam Sai Yuk as Sam Chun San
Ho Chi Wai as White Tiger
Phillip So Yuen Fung as Blue Dragon

Reception
The website shaolinchanmber36.com calls the film one of David Chiang's top 5 best works.

References

External links

1980 martial arts films
Hong Kong comedy films
1980 comedy films
1980 films
Films directed by Eric Tsang
1980s Hong Kong films